The 2019 K League 1 was the 37th season of the top division of professional football in South Korea since its establishment in 1983, and the seventh season of the K League 1. Jeonbuk Hyundai Motors were the defending champions.

In the 17th round on 23 June, Pohang Steelers were leading Gangwon FC 4–0 away after 70 minutes, but Gangwon scored five unanswered goals including three in injury time to win 5–4.

Teams

General information

Stadiums

Foreign players
Restricting the number of foreign players strictly to four per team, including a slot for a player from AFC countries. A team could use four foreign players on the field each game including at least one player from the AFC confederation. Players name in bold indicates the player is registered during the mid-season transfer window.

League table

Positions by matchday

Round 1–33

Round 34–38

Results

Matches 1–22 
Teams play each other twice, once at home, once away.

Matches 23–33
Teams play every other team once (either at home or away).

Matches 34–38
After 33 matches, the league splits into two sections of six teams each, with teams playing every other team in their section once (either at home or away). The exact matches are determined upon the league table at the time of the split.

Final A

Final B

Relegation playoffs

Player statistics

Top scorers

Source:

Top assist providers

Source:

Awards

Main awards 
The 2019 K League Awards was held on 2 December 2019.

Best XI 

Source:

Monthly awards

Player of the Round

Attendance 
Attendants who entered with free ticket are not counted.

See also
2019 in South Korean football
2019 K League 2
2019 Korean FA Cup

References

External links

K League 1 seasons
South Korea
2019 in South Korean football